A statue of author, historian, and minister Edward Everett Hale by Bela Pratt is installed in Boston's Public Garden, in the U.S. state of Massachusetts. The bronze sculpture was dedicated on March 3, 1913. It was surveyed as part of the Smithsonian Institution's "Save Outdoor Sculpture!" program in 1993.

References

External links

 

1913 establishments in Massachusetts
1913 sculptures
Boston Public Garden
Bronze sculptures in Massachusetts
Monuments and memorials in Boston
Outdoor sculptures in Boston
Sculptures of men in Massachusetts
Statues in Boston